Galtara nepheloptera is a moth of the subfamily Arctiinae. It was described by George Hampson in 1910. It is found in Angola, Namibia and South Africa.

References

 

Nyctemerina
Moths described in 1910